Reedley may refer to:
Reedley, Lancashire, England, United Kingdom
Reedley, California, United States of America